ULC may refer to:

 Uniform Law Commission, a non-profit American unincorporated organization that produces draft legislation
 Unit labor cost, another term for a wage
 Unlimited Liability Corporation, a Canadian corporation designation
 Union de Luttes Communistes, a former Communist party in the country now known as Burkina Faso
 University of Las Condes, a Chilean private university existing from 1987 to 1999
 Universal Life Church, a non-denominational religious organization founded in 1962
 Urząd Lotnictwa Cywilnego, the Civil Aviation Office of Poland
 Underwriters' Laboratories of Canada
 BCCM/ULC, a cyanobacteria collection part of the Belgian Co-ordinated Collections of Micro-organisms
 ULC, National Rail code for Ulceby railway station, North Lincolnshire, England